Puls is a German surname, derived from the Slavic forename Boleš, a short form of Bolesław, meaning "great glory."

Notable people with the surname include:

Eric Puls (born 1971), American soccer player
Hans-Joachim Puls, German rower
Stan Puls, (1916–98), American double-bassist

See also
 Pulß

References